Domaníky is a village and municipality in the Krupina District of the Banská Bystrica Region of Slovakia.

History
In historical records, the village was first mentioned in 1135 when it belonged to János and Rubin from Esztergom. In 1382 German settlers established here and old records indicate that the village was called Domanik Theutonicalis ("German Domaniky"). In the 14th century it belonged to Čabraď Castle and in the 18th century to the Fogláry and Keviczky nobles.

Genealogical resources

The records for genealogical research are available at the state archive "Statny Archiv in Banska Bystrica, Slovakia"

 Roman Catholic church records (births/marriages/deaths): 1810-1895 (parish B)
 Lutheran church records (births/marriages/deaths): 1786-1895 (parish B)

See also
 List of municipalities and towns in Slovakia

External links
 
 
https://web.archive.org/web/20071116010355/http://www.statistics.sk/mosmis/eng/run.html.  
http://www.e-obce.sk/obec/domaniky/domaniky.html
Surnames of living people in Domaniky

Villages and municipalities in Krupina District